Marjorie Johnson Fowler (July 16, 1920 – July 8, 2003) was an American film editor. She was nominated for the Academy Award for Best Film Editing in 1968 for Doctor Dolittle.

She was the daughter of the screenwriter Nunnally Johnson, and sister of the novelist Nora Johnson.

Her husband, the film editor and director Gene Fowler Jr. died in 1998.

Selected filmography
The Woman in the Window (1944)
Mr. Peabody and the Mermaid (1948)
 Man in the Attic (1953)
 Crime of Passion (1957)
 Stopover Tokyo (1957)
 Separate Tables (1958)
 The Man Who Understood Women (1959)
 Elmer Gantry (1960)
 The Outsider (1961)
 Mr. Hobbs Takes a Vacation (1962)
 Take Her, She's Mine (1963)
 What a Way to Go! (1964)
 Dear Brigitte (1965)
 Doctor Dolittle (1967)
 Once You Kiss a Stranger (1970)
 The Blue Knight (1973, TV)
 It's My Turn (1980)
 The Marva Collins Story (1981, TV)
 Family Secrets (1984, TV)

References

External links
 
 

1920 births
2003 deaths
American film editors
American women film editors
21st-century American women